The Habit of Art is a 2009 play by English playwright Alan Bennett, centred on a fictional meeting between W. H. Auden and Benjamin Britten while Britten is composing the opera Death in Venice. It premiered on 5 November 2009 at the Lyttelton Theatre at the Royal National Theatre, with the central roles filled by Alex Jennings as Britten and Richard Griffiths as Auden (the latter replacing Michael Gambon, who had to withdraw from the production due to minor ill health). The performance of April 22, 2010 was broadcast to more than 200 cinemas worldwide by NTLive.

Synopsis
The Habit of Art centres on Fitz, Henry, Tim and Donald, who are actors rehearsing a play called Caliban's Day. (The title reflects Auden's view that The Tempest was incomplete and Caliban should have an epilogue.) The director has been called away, so they have a run-through/workshop directed by the stage manager, Kay, in the presence of the playwright, Neil.

Caliban's Day is about a fictitious meeting in 1972 in Auden's rooms at Oxford, between Auden (Fitz) in his latter years and Britten (Henry). Auden has hired a rent boy, Stuart (Tim) and when Humphrey Carpenter (Donald) - who will write biographies of both Auden and Britten after their deaths - arrives to interview him, Auden mistakes him for Stuart. Britten has been auditioning boys for Death in Venice nearby, and arrives unexpectedly (their first meeting in 25 years after they fell out over the failure of their opera Paul Bunyan). He wants to discuss his misgivings about the paedophilic theme of Death in Venice and the light that may cast on his own life, but Auden assumes Britten wants him to write the libretto.

The characters intermittently break out of the rehearsal to discuss the play, how accurately/harshly it should treat Auden's failings, the actor's craft and many other issues raised by Auden, Britten and the play. In doing so, they reveal something of their own backgrounds.

Productions 
The world premier production commenced on 5 November 2009 at the Lyttelton Theatre at the National Theatre, directed by Nicholas Hytner.

The play was revived in a new production by The Original Theatre Company, York Theatre Royal and Ghost Light Theatre Productions and toured the UK in late 2018.

The music by Britten includes: ‘The Ash Grove’, The Turn of the Screw, Peter Grimes and The Young Person’s Guide to the Orchestra.

Critical reception 
Critical reaction to the original production of the play was generally positive. Michael Billington (The Guardian) said it was a ‘superbly fluid production ... and is beautifully acted’; and Charles Spenser (The Telegraph) says ‘The Habit of Art is another absolute cracker, often wonderfully and sometimes filthily funny’. However, Benedict Nightingale (The Times) was  more critical and suggested that ‘the play lacks dramatic tension’, and Andrew Billen (New Statesman) said that the ‘humour obscures the character of [the] play’. Critics identified and examined the themes of the play: ‘a multi-levelled work that deals with sex, death, creativity, biography and much else besides’, and one in which ‘the knack of making ordinary people seem greater than they are, and revealing important people as being ordinarily human like the rest of us’ (Peter Brown, London Theatre). Billington suggests that the play ‘is at its strongest when it deals with the theme implicit in its title: the idea that, for the artist, creativity is a constant, if troubling imperative’. Spenser also notes of the author that ‘there is a confidence here, a sense of a writer pushing himself to the limits ... that is hugely invigorating’. Brown says that ‘whether you’re an ardent Bennett fan or not, it’s pretty much unmissable’.

References

External links
http://www.nationaltheatre.org.uk/51766/productions/the-habit-of-art.html

2009 plays
Plays by Alan Bennett
Metafictional plays
Plays based on real people
Works based on The Tempest
Oxford in fiction
Plays set in England